Fuzzy Dapaah Torbay was a Ghanaian politician and a member of the 1st and 2nd parliament of the 4th republic of Ghana representing Okere constituency under the membership of the National Democratic Congress (NDC).

Early life 
Fuzzy was born on 22 May 1952 in the Eastern Region of Ghana. He attended Okuapeman Secondary School in Akropong. He then proceeded to learn more skills in Metal Fabrication and Manufacturing at Varta Ag. Industries where he became an artisan. He worked as an industrialist and agriculturist after his experience at Varta Ag. Industries.

Political career 
He was first elected into parliament in the 1992 Ghanaian parliamentary election on the ticket of the National Democratic Congress. He was elected again on 7 January 1997 after being pronounced winner at the 1996 Ghanaian General Election having defeated Kwaku Asamoah of the Convention People's Party, Joe Mantey of the New Patriotic Party and Duodu Simpson Samuel of the People's National Convention. Fuzzy obtained 43.60% of the total valid votes cast which is equivalent to 9,252 votes while his oppositions obtained 28.30% which is equivalent to 6,009 votes, 6.80% which is equivalent to 1,450 votes and 1.90% which is equivalent to 403 votes respectively.

Fuzzy lost his seat after he was defeated by Brandford K. Adu of the New Patriotic Party at the 2000 Ghanaian General elections. He obtained 47.20% of the total valid votes cast which is equivalent to 7,313 votes while Brandford obtained 47.30% which is equivalent to a tight number of 7,322 votes.

Personal life 
He is a Muslim.

Death 
Fuzzy Dapaah Torbay died on 18 July 2002 in New Jersey after a brief illness. He left behind a wife and four children.

References 

Ghanaian MPs 1997–2001
People from Eastern Region (Ghana)
Ghanaian agriculturalists
1952 births
2002 deaths
Ghanaian MPs 1993–1997
National Democratic Congress (Ghana) politicians
Ghanaian Muslims